Kamalky Laureano (born 1983) is a hyperrealist painter from the Dominican Republic. Living in Mexico City since 2006, he has made his life and work in that country.

His work has been shown in Italy, Argentina, France, Mexico, the United States and the Dominican Republic. It consists mostly of portraits of big canvas, urban landscapes, and toys paintings.

References

1983 births
Living people
Dominican Republic painters
21st-century painters